The Royal Bend of Castile (Banda Real de Castilla) was the heraldic flag of the monarchs of the Crown of Castile, a personal banner of military use, distinctive indicating to the troops the presence of the monarch and allowed them to have identified his position in the battles. This insignia, who joined in the symbolism of the king of Castile to heraldic flag with the Castile and Leonese arms, was created in 1332 by the king Alfonso XI of Castile, although its origin probably would go back to one of the primitive symbols of the Counts of Castile, which had consisted of a gold bend on gules (red). The dragantes appeared on the handpiece or baton when Scipio brought the Roman legions to Hispania.

Alfonso XI founded the Order of the Royal Band of Castile to reward the best services to the sovereign.

The Bend of Castile was used by all the monarchs that had Castile until Charles V, Holy Roman Empire. It consisted, from the reign of Henry IV of Castile, on a reddish flag, probably purple scarlet, with a golden bend of throaty dragantes heads of the same color.

The dragantes are the heraldic representation of dragons.

Prior to the reign of Henry IV, the colors were something changing and have been preserved representations of the Royal Bend of Castile in the reign of Peter of Castile with dragantes of white and black color bend.

The Bend of Castile description from Henry I reign was: Gules, a bend or engouled into dragantes (dragon or wolf's heads). Before, the bend and the dragon's heads were different colours.

The Castilian Bend origin was the old Count of Castile's coat of arms Gules a bend Or -, after "Gules, a three towered castle Or"

The Catholic Monarchs used the Castilian Bend between a yoke with ribbons Or (on obverse side) and a sheaf of arrows with ribbons Or (on reverse side) and their motto: Tanto Monta, Monta Tanto ("cutting as untying") an explanation of the equality of the monarchs.
Charles I  used the Bend between the Pillars of Hercules, External Oraments of the King-Emperor's heraldry.

Later use of the Royal Bend of Castile
Francisco Franco, General and Head of State of Spain, used from 1940 to 1975 the Castilian Bend (like the version of Charles I) as Head of State’s Standard and Guidon: The Bend between the Pillars of Hercules, crowned with an imperial crown and open (old) royal crown. The Bend between the Pillars of Hercules also were depicting in the personal coat of arms used by Franco as Head of Spanish State

See also 
Heraldry of Castile
Knights of the Band
Female order of the Band

References

Band of Castile
14th-century establishments in Castile
Heraldic charges
Castille